This is a list of singles that have peaked in the Top 10 of the Billboard Hot 100 during 1978.

Bee Gees and Andy Gibb each had four top-ten hits in 1978, tying them for the most top-ten hits during the year.

Top-ten singles

1977 peaks

1979 peaks

See also
 1978 in music
 List of Hot 100 number-one singles of 1978 (U.S.)
 Billboard Year-End Hot 100 singles of 1978

References

General sources

Joel Whitburn Presents the Billboard Hot 100 Charts: The Seventies
Additional information obtained can be verified within Billboard's online archive services and print editions of the magazine.

1978
United States Hot 100 Top 10